RAAN may refer to:
 North Caribbean Coast Autonomous Region, formerly the North Atlantic Autonomous Region (Región Autónoma del Atlántico Norte),  in Nicaragua
 Right ascension of the ascending node, one of six orbital elements that define the trajectory of an orbiting body